Francisco López (born 19 September 1962) is a Venezuelan table tennis player. He competed in the men's singles event at the 1988 Summer Olympics.

References

External links
 

1962 births
Living people
Venezuelan male table tennis players
Olympic table tennis players of Venezuela
Table tennis players at the 1988 Summer Olympics
Place of birth missing (living people)
20th-century Venezuelan people
21st-century Venezuelan people